The Kilkenny–Wexford rivalry is a hurling rivalry between Irish county teams Kilkenny and Wexford.

While both teams play provincial hurling in the Leinster Senior Hurling Championship, they have also enjoyed success in the All-Ireland Senior Hurling Championship, having won 42 championship titles between them to date. In spite of this they have never met in an All-Ireland final.

External links
 Kilkenny v Wexford all-time results

Wexford
Wexford county hurling team rivalries